Sentilo (possibly Quechua for peccary) is a  mountain in the Cordillera Blanca in the Andes of Peru. It is located in Ancash Region, Huaylas Province, Santa Cruz District. Sentilo lies at the Punta Unión pass, the highest point of the Santa Cruz valley, south of the mountains Rinrijirca and Pucajirca, southwest of Taulliraju, and northeast of mountains Artesonraju and Parón.

Santa Cruz Creek originates near Sentilo.

See also 
 Lake Jatuncocha
 Lake Ichiccocha
 Quitaraju
 Caraz (mountain)

References

Mountains of Peru
Mountains of Ancash Region